Garden Township may refer to:

United States
 Garden Township, Woodruff County, Arkansas, a township in Woodruff County, Arkansas
 Garden Township, Boone County, Iowa
 Garden Township, Cherokee County, Kansas
 Garden Township, Harvey County, Kansas
 Garden Township, Michigan
 Garden Township, Polk County, Minnesota

Zambia
 Garden Township, Lusaka

See also
Garden town (disambiguation)
 Green Garden Township (disambiguation)
 New Garden Township, Wayne County, Indiana
 Spring Garden Township, Jefferson County, Illinois

Township name disambiguation pages